Behzad Lucknavi (born Sardar Hasan Khan; 1 January 1900  10 October  1974) was a Pakistani Urdu poet and lyricist. He primarily wrote naats and ghazals and sometimes radio plays for the All India Radio, Delhi and later for Radio Pakistan after immigrating to Pakistan.

Prior to his migration from India, he used to participate in mushairas at an apparent age of twelve after Zulfiqar Ali Bukhari introduced him to the All India Radio. He wrote lyrics for seventeen films, including Roti, Taj Mahal and Dhanwan.

Biography 
He was born as Sardar Hasan Khan on 1 January 1900 in United Province, British India (in modern-day Lucknow, India). He initially worked in the Indian Railways but later for the AIR at ₹120 per month. He was later employed by the Radio Pakistan where he used to recite naats as a part of congregational prayer. He also wrote some uncertain radio plays. As a gazal writer, he contributed to the Urdu literature of Pakistan. An Indian singer, Begum Akhtar earned her recognition after she sung her first gazal Diwana banana hai toh by Lakhnavi. He also wrote lyrics, including "Mere Liye Woh Gham-e-Intezaar" for the film Anokha Pyar sung by Lata Mangeshkar.

Publications

Filmography

Personal life 
He spent his last days in difficult circumstances due to financial crisis and medical complications. He then submit a request to the Karachi Municipal Corporation for financial assistance, for which was given PKR1,000 for his surgery. The commissioner of Karachi later offered him a government job at primary school as a teacher but he refused the post. He died on 10 October 1974 in Karachi, Pakistan.

References

External links 
 Behzad Lakhnavi at Rekhta

1900 births
1974 deaths
Urdu-language poets from Pakistan
Muhajir people
Poets from Karachi
Pakistani performers of Islamic music
Urdu-language lyricists
Writers from Lucknow